Halland County is one of the 29 multi-member constituencies of the Riksdag, the national legislature of Sweden. The constituency was established in 1970 when the Riksdag changed from a bicameral legislature to a unicameral legislature. It is conterminous with the county of Halland. The constituency currently elects 10 of the 349 members of the Riksdag using the open party-list proportional representation electoral system. At the 2022 general election it had 258,794 registered electors.

Electoral system
Halland County currently elects 10 of the 349 members of the Riksdag using the open party-list proportional representation electoral system. Constituency seats are allocated using the modified Sainte-Laguë method. Only parties that that reach the 4% national threshold and parties that receive at least 12% of the vote in the constituency compete for constituency seats. Supplementary leveling seats may also be allocated at the constituency level to parties that reach the 4% national threshold.

Election results

Summary

(Excludes leveling seats)

Detailed

2020s

2022
Results of the 2022 general election held on 11 September 2022:

The following candidates were elected:
 Constituency seats - Christofer Bergenblock (C), 868 votes; Aida Birinxhiku (S), 1,465 votes; Sara-Lena Bjälkö (SD), 58 votes; Carita Boulwén (SD), 235 votes; Adnan Dibrani (S), 1,994 votes; Erik Hellsborn (SD), 51 votes; Jennie Nilsson (S), 2,037 votes; Lars Püss (M), 1,213 votes; Larry Söder (KD), 153 votes; and Helena Storckenfeldt (M), 954 votes.
 Leveling seats - Jan Riise (MP), 171 votes; and Cecilia Rönn (L), 494 votes.

2010s

2018
Results of the 2018 general election held on 9 September 2018:

The following candidates were elected:
 Constituency seats - Adnan Dibrani (S), 3,313 votes; Staffan Eklöf (SD), 1 votes; Bengt Eliasson (L), 422 votes; Hans Hoff (S), 1,106 votes; Ola Johansson (C), 1,253 votes; Ulrika Jörgensen (M), 1,142 votes; Jennie Nilsson (S), 1,516 votes; Larry Söder (KD), 482 votes; Jörgen Warborn (M), 2,717 votes; and Eric Westroth (SD), 4 votes.
 Leveling seats - Elisabeth Falkhaven (MP), 212 votes; Lars Püss (M), 829 votes; and Jon Thorbjörnson (V), 435 votes.

2014
Results of the 2014 general election held on 14 September 2014:

The following candidates were elected:
 Constituency seats - Jeff Ahl (SD); Agneta Börjesson (MP), 555 votes; Adnan Dibrani (S), 3,226 votes; Hans Hoff (S), 2,346 votes; Ola Johansson (C), 1,163 votes; Jennie Nilsson (S), 1,649 votes; Jenny Petersson (M), 1,733 votes; Johnny Skalin (SD), 4 votes; Michael Svensson (M), 1,415 votes; and Jörgen Warborn (M), 3,163 votes.
 Leveling seats - Bengt Eliasson (FP), 565 votes; and Göran Hägglund (KD), 1,423 votes.

2010
Results of the 2010 general election held on 19 September 2010:

The following candidates were elected:
 Constituency seats - Agneta Börjesson (MP), 433 votes; Anne Marie Brodén (M), 1,053 votes; Adnan Dibrani (S), 2,602 votes; Jan Ertsborn (FP), 924 votes; Hans Hoff (S), 2,350 votes; Ola Johansson (C), 1,087 votes; Jennie Nilsson (S), 1,626 votes; Jenny Petersson (M), 926 votes; Michael Svensson (M), 659 votes; and Henrik von Sydow (M), 5,045 votes.
 Leveling seats - Lars Gustafsson (KD), 551 votes; and Mikael Jansson (SD), 108 votes.

2000s

2006
Results of the 2006 general election held on 17 September 2006:

The following candidates were elected:
 Constituency seats - Jan Andersson (C), 1,079 votes; Anne Marie Brodén (M), 936 votes; Alf Eriksson (S), 1,272 votes; Jan Ertsborn (FP), 818 votes; Lars Gustafsson (KD), 497 votes; Hans Hoff (S), 2,115 votes; Marianne Kierkemann (M), 1,816 votes; Jennie Nilsson (S), 2,039 votes; Magdalena Streijffert (S), 1,114 votes; and Henrik von Sydow (M), 4,365 votes.

2002
Results of the 2002 general election held on 15 September 2002:

The following candidates were elected:
 Constituency seats - Jan Andersson (C), 1,932 votes; Anne Marie Brodén (M), 1,350 votes; Alf Eriksson (S), 2,664 votes; Jan Ertsborn (FP), 1,480 votes; Lars Gustafsson (KD), 935 votes; Hans Hoff (S), 2,109 votes; Lennart Kollmats (FP), 2,112 votes; Pär Axel Sahlberg (S), 1,241 votes; Henrik von Sydow (M), 3,033 votes; and Majléne Westerlund Panke (S), 1,790 votes.
 Leveling seats - Kjell-Erik Karlsson (V), 780 votes.

1990s

1998
Results of the 1998 general election held on 20 September 1998:

The following candidates were elected:
 Constituency seats - Jörgen Andersson (S), 3,883 votes; Alf Eriksson (S), 1,090 votes; Carl Fredrik Graf (M), 4,660 votes; Lars Gustafsson (KD), 367 votes; Hans Hjortzberg-Nordlund (M), 698 votes; Kjell-Erik Karlsson (V), 1,664 votes; Rolf Kenneryd (C), 1,828 votes; Ingegerd Sahlström (S), 2,622 votes; Liselotte Wågö (M), 1,244 votes; and Majléne Westerlund Panke (S), 384 votes.
 Leveling seats - Lennart Kollmats (FP), 743 votes; and Ester Lindstedt Staaf (KD), 273 votes.

1994
Results of the 1994 general election held on 18 September 1994:

1991
Results of the 1991 general election held on 15 September 1991:

1980s

1988
Results of the 1988 general election held on 18 September 1988:

1985
Results of the 1985 general election held on 15 September 1985:

1982
Results of the 1982 general election held on 19 September 1982:

1970s

1979
Results of the 1979 general election held on 16 September 1979:

1976
Results of the 1976 general election held on 19 September 1976:

1973
Results of the 1973 general election held on 16 September 1973:

1970
Results of the 1970 general election held on 20 September 1970:

References

Riksdag constituency
Riksdag constituencies
Riksdag constituencies established in 1970